Pifffle & Co. is a Canadian comedy television series which aired on CBC Television in 1971.

Premise
Terry David Mulligan and Bill Reiter hosted this Vancouver-produced series, whose title was intentially spelled with three F's. The sketches were performed by series regulars Allan Anderson, Graeme Campbell, Roxanne Erwin, Joseph Golland, Micki Maunsell, Shirley Milliner and Carol Oczkowska.

Each episode was dedicated to a satirical examination of particular topic, based on titles such as "Pifffle & Co. vs. Canadians", "Pifffle & Co. vs. Health", "Pifffle & Co. vs. Love" and "Pifffle & Co. vs. Women's Lib".

Scheduling
This half-hour series was broadcast on Sundays at 5:30 p.m. (Eastern) from 11 July to 26 September 1971.

See also
 A Second Look (1969, also produced and directed by Al Vitols)

References

External links
 
 

CBC Television original programming
1971 Canadian television series debuts
1971 Canadian television series endings